Paulus Manker (born 25 January 1958) is an Austrian film director and actor, as well as an author and screenplay writer.

Manker is considered one of the most maverick German-speaking actors, and polarizes public opinion like scarcely no other. He is perceived as a "staggering all-round talent on the Austrian cultural scene."

Life
Manker is the son of actress  and theatre director Gustav Manker. He trained at the Max Reinhardt Drama School in Vienna, studying acting and directing. Manker made his film debut in Lemminge (Lemmings) (dir. Michael Haneke) in 1979.

Manker's initial engagements while still at drama school took him to the Viennese Burgtheater (1979, Arthur Schnitzler's Comedy of Seduction with set design by Hans Hollein and costumes by Karl Lagerfeld), then to the Vienna Festival (1980, The Last Days of Mankind by Karl Kraus), and on to participation in the "co-determination model" at the Schauspielhaus Frankfurt (1980/81), to the Thalia Theater in Hamburg (1982, Jean Genet's Deathwatch and also to the Residenztheater in Munich, where in 1983 he first worked with director Peter Zadek (Henrik Ibsen's The Master Builder with Barbara Sukowa), where he became a long-term member of Zadek's famous ensemble.

As a film actor, Manker first appeared in Lemmings in 1979 (directed by Michael Haneke). Then followed Exit – Don't Panic (1980) and The Locked-Out (1982, based on the novel by Elfriede Jelinek),  by Alexander Kluge (1983) and Who was Edgar Allan? (1984, also directed by Michael Haneke), as well as Luc Bondy's The Distant Land (1987), alongside Michel Piccoli.

In 1986, Peter Zadek invited Manker to join the famous ensemble at the Deutsches Schauspielhaus in Hamburg, of which he was a member from 1986 to 1989. Here, for the first time, he played on stage the leading role of anti-Semitic Jewish philosopher Otto Weininger in the play Weininger's Last Night by Joshua Sobol, which caused much furore. After that, he was Octavius Caesar in Shakespeare's Julius Caesar with Ulrich Tukur, Lindekuh in Frank Wedekind's Musik (Music) with Susanne Lothar, and slave trader Casti-Piani in Peter Zadek's legendary staging of Frank Wedekind's Lulu.

Manker first worked as a film director in 1985, and his film Schmutz (Dirt) premiered at the 1985 Cannes Film Festival in the Quinzaine des Réalisateurs. The film received several awards at other festivals, and was turned into a novel by Thorsten Becker. In 1988 there followed Weininger's Last Night, in 1992 The Eye of the Typhoon with German rock band Einstürzende Neubauten, in 1995 The Moor's Head, based on a screenplay by Michael Haneke with Gert Voss in his first film role, and Angela Winkler, then in 1996 the documentary film Hans Hollein – Everything is Architecture plus various short films including, in 2004, the portrait of his 80-year-old mother, actress Hilde Sochor.

"As a director, Manker experiments with psycho shockers (Dirt, Weininger's Last Night) and draws the audience into his aggressive multimedia theatre dramas. Manker's general theme is the creeping insanity of a society to which he holds up a distorting mirror."

Manker first worked as a director at the Vienna Volkstheater, with Weiningers Nacht (Weininger's Last Night) by Joshua Sobol, in which he himself also played the leading role, and which became his most famous role. The performance became Manker's greatest triumph to date, and he himself subsequently turned the play into a film. "One rarely comes across such a sensuously and intellectually exciting, enlightening, sensational film." (Simone Mahrenholz, Der Tagesspiegel)

In 1990, Manker returned to the Viennese Burgtheater under Claus Peymann, and took the role of Carlos in Peymann's production of Goethe's Clavigo (with Ulrich Mühe as Clavigo). He was also Bassanio in Peter Zadek's production of Shakespeare's The Merchant of Venice (with Gert Voss as Shylock and Eva Mattes as Portia), and Pozzo in Samuel Beckett's Waiting for Godot). In 1993, he staged Franz Molnar's Liliom at the Burgtheater, and in 1996 Bertolt Brecht's Threepenny Opera (with costumes by Vivienne Westwood).

Manker's performance as Shakespeare's Richard III (1997), staged by Peter Zadek at the Münchner Kammerspiele, generated most heated discussions, where conflict arose with the theatre and its director Dieter Dorn, whereupon the production was cancelled despite its huge success with the public. "A huge success is being dropped here, one which could have been played for years, merely out of pusillanimity." (Peter Zadek)

In 1996, Manker and Israeli writer Joshua Sobol, who became his most important artistic partner, created Alma – Widow of the four Arts at the former Sanatorium Purkersdorf, a simultaneous drama about artists' muse Alma Mahler-Werfel and her men, which became a cult play and has since been played every year at a different venue, having already crossed three continents and had over 400 performances in Vienna, Venice, Lisbon, Los Angeles, Berlin, Jerusalem and Prague. The production involves the audience interactively in the creation of their own theatrical experience, and they become "companions of the figures journeying through the travel-drama, themselves selecting the events, the path and the person whom they follow, thereby constructing, destroying and resurrecting their own version of the polydrama". Between 1997 and 1999, the play was filmed under the title Alma – Widow of the 4 Arts as a 3-part TV film. In the production, produced by Manker himself, Manker also has the role of the expressionist painter Oskar Kokoschka.

In 2000, with the cyber-show F@lco at the Viennese Ronacher Theatre, Manker and Sobol created a multimedia musical about the pop star Falco. Then in 2003, continuing the collaboration with Sobol, an invitation came from Tel Aviv to stage at the Cameri Theatre the premiere of Sobol's iWitness, the story of Franz Jägerstätter, who refused to enter military service and was hanged by the Nazis, a parallel to the soldiers of the Israeli army who refused to serve in the Occupied Territories. The production made the young Itay Tiran a star.

Manker played the suicidal organist in Joseph Vilsmaier's Brother of Sleep (1994), as well as playing in Michael Haneke's The Castle (1998) and in Code Unknown with Juliette Binoche (1999). He also performed in Michael Glawogger's film Slumming, a 2006 entry in the Berlin Film Festival competition section; in this film, with a "hyperplastic presence", Manker portrays homeless alcoholic Franz Kallmann in the style of a poète maudit, "truly setting his role on fire" (ARTE).

Paulus Manker engaged in more theatre work with Luc Bondy (Ödön von Horvath's Figaro Gets a Divorce, 1998), with Christoph Schlingensief (Foreigners Out! Schlingensief's Container, 2000) and on repeated occasions with Peter Zadek (White Rabbit in Alice in Wonderland, 1996, Polonius in Hamlet, with Angela Winkler and Otto Sander, Hamburg, 2000), The Jew of Malta (2001) as well as in plays by Botho Strauss.

In 2010 Manker appeared in the Salzburg Festival as Theseus in the acclaimed production of Jean Racine's Phèdre, playing alongside Sunnyi Melles. In the same year, he published a comprehensive book about his father, film director, set designer and theatre director Gustav Manker.

In 2010, Manker was awarded the prestigious Nestroy Audience Award.

Collaboration with Joshua Sobol
Israeli writer Joshua Sobol is Manker's most important artistic partner. Manker has been working with him since 1985, and together they have completed a whole series of projects intended to create new spatial realms and forms of theatrical experience.

In 1995, together with Niklas Frank, they adapted Frank's reckoning with his father Hans Frank, Hitler's governor-general in Poland. At the Theater an der Wien in Vienna, the audience was turned on a revolving stage from scene to scene, and with the aid of hydraulics, even taken down below stage. They called it a "horror train trip" and used film clips and documents from Frank's private family album. 
In 1996, Manker and Sobol created their most successful project to date: Alma – Widow of the four Arts, an interactive drama about Alma Mahler-Werfel, in which over 50 scenes were played simultaneously in the rooms of the art-deco Sanatorium Purkersdorf outside Vienna. The show's 16-year history to date has taken the performance of Alma on tour to the various cities in which her life unfolded: Venice (2002), Lisbon (2003), Los Angeles (2004), Petronell near Vienna (2005), Berlin (2006), to Semmering in 2007, Jerusalem in 2009, from 2008 to 2010 to Vienna, and in 2011 in Prague. 
In 2000 Sobol and Manker created a multimedia spectacle at the Viennese Ronacher Theatre: F@lco – A Cyber Show, about Austrian rock star Falco, which was presented on a stage built out into the auditorium in an @ shape in the form of a rock concert with laser, 3D animation and water screen, where the audience was directly involved and could smoke, eat and drink and join in the dancing. By way of contrast, the "remote" audience stood in the boxes, from where they could see both the play and the participating audience.

Film direction
 1985: Schmutz (Dirt) 1987 "Prize for the best director" and "Special recommendation for the soundtrack", Ghent / 1986 "Premio para a primeira obra", Troia 1986 / "Prix de la Commission Supérieure technique", Avoriaz / "Goldener Kader 1988", for cameraman Walter Kindler. Entered into the 15th Moscow International Film Festival.
 1988: Weiningers Nacht (Weininger's Last Night) Austrian entry for European Film Award 1990 / "Golden Romy 1990" (Best director)
 1992: Das Auge des Taifun (The Eye of the Typhoon) Documentary about a performance of Erich Wonder and Heiner Müller with German Rockband "Einstürzende Neubauten"
 1995: Der Kopf des Mohren (The Moor's Head) based on a screenplay by Michael Haneke, Fimfestival Cannes 1995 / Prize for Best Films Distribution (Brussels 1995) Interfilm-Prize (Max Ophüls Prize Saarbrücken) Opening film of the Salzburg Festival 1995 (Festival hall)
 1996: Hans Hollein – Everything is Architecture TV-documentary on Austrian architect Hans Hollein
 1997: Alma – The Widow of the 4 Arts (The life of Alma Mahler-Werfel)
 2004: Where Blade Runner meets Batman – Downtown Los Angeles
 2004: Die Seele brennt heut wieder sehr''' – Porträt Hilde Sochor (80)
 2005: Mozart in America (Mozart Minute)Films as an actor (selection)
 1979: Lemminge (dir. Michael Haneke), TV
 1980: Exit... nur keine Panik (dir. Franz Novotny)
 1982: The Locked-out (dir. Franz Novotny)
 1983:  (dir. Alexander Kluge)
 1984: Who was Edgar Allan? (dir. Michael Haneke)
 1987: The Distant Land (dir. Luc Bondy)
 1988: Sternberg - Shooting Star (dir. )
 1988: My 20th Century (dir. Ildikó Enyedi)
 1989:  (dir. Paulus Manker)
 1990: Common Death (dir. Michael Schottenberg)
 1991:  (dir. Oliver Hirschbiegel)
 1993:  (dir. )
 1994: Brother of Sleep (dir. Joseph Vilsmaier)
 1996: The Castle (dir. Michael Haneke)
 1997: Alma (dir. Paulus Manker)
 1999: Code Inconnu (dir. Michael Haneke)
 2000:  (dir. Jo Baier)
 2002:  (dir. )
 2002: Foreigners out! Schlingensiefs Container 2003:  (dir. Julian Pölsler)
 2004:  (dir. )
 2006: Slumming (dir. Michael Glawogger)
 2015: Jack (dir. Elisabeth Scharang)'' 
 2022: Schächten (dir.Thomas Roth)

References

External links
 

1958 births
Living people
20th-century Austrian people
21st-century Austrian people
Austrian film directors
German-language film directors
Austrian male stage actors
Male actors from Vienna
Austrian male film actors